David Hampton Pryor (born August 29, 1934) is an American politician and former Democratic United States Representative and United States Senator from the State of Arkansas. Pryor also served as the 39th Governor of Arkansas from 1975 to 1979 and was a member of the Arkansas House of Representatives from 1960 to 1966. He served as the interim chairman of the Arkansas Democratic Party, following Bill Gwatney's assassination.

Early life
Pryor was born in Camden, the seat of Ouachita County in southern Arkansas, to William Edgar Pryor and the former Susan Pryor. Both had deep roots in Arkansas; the marriage 'united two of the pioneer families of Arkansas'. William Pryor moved to Camden from Holly Springs in 1923 and started selling cars. By 1933, he had bought the partners out of the business and become sole owner of Edgar Pryor Inc, a well-known Chevrolet dealership in the area. The family was also involved in the civic, religious and political life of Camden, with W.E. serving as Ouachita County Sheriff from 1939 to 1942.

David was a third generation Ouachita County resident. He attended public schools in Camden, attended Henderson State Teacher's College in Arkadelphia, and graduated from the University of Arkansas in Fayetteville in 1957. Pryor was founder and publisher of the Ouachita Citizen from 1957 to 1960. He graduated from law school at the University of Arkansas in 1964 and was admitted to the bar that same year.

Political career
Pryor first won elected office representing Ouachita County in the Arkansas House of Representatives in 1960. Seated as a member of the 63rd Arkansas General Assembly, Pryor would win reelection to the seat in 1962 and 1964.

He was elected to Congress in 1966 following a vacancy that year after U.S. President Lyndon B. Johnson appointed fellow Democrat Oren Harris to a federal judgeship. In the primary, Pryor defeated the Texarkana lawyer Richard S. Arnold, whom he later described as "a very, very close friend." Pryor thereafter defeated the Republican candidate, A. Lynn Lowe of Texarkana, by a comfortable margin. Lowe would subsequently become chairman of the fledgling Arkansas GOP. Pryor was reelected to the House twice and served from November 8, 1966 to January 3, 1973.

He was not a candidate for reelection in 1972. Instead he failed in a hard-fought campaign to wrest the Democratic U.S. Senate nomination from the popular conservative John L. McClellan, from Sheridan, Arkansas.

The race for Governor

Pryor's next success came in the 1974 gubernatorial race. He was elected to succeed Dale Bumpers, who won the Senate seat long held by J. William Fulbright in the same year. Pryor first defeated former Governor Orval Faubus in the primary and then crushed the Republican nominee, Ken Coon, who would also later chair the Arkansas GOP. He was reelected in 1976 by a huge margin over the Republican Leon Griffith, a plumber from Pine Bluff, the seat of Jefferson County, who relocated to North Little Rock during the campaign. Before they could face Pryor, Coon and Griffith first had to defeat Joseph H. Weston of Cave City, editor of the controversial Sharp Citizen newspaper, whose work led to a change in Arkansas libel law.

Pryor's gubernatorial tenure extended from 1975 to January 3, 1979.

Lieutenant Governor Joe Purcell was an interim successor for six days as governor until the beginning of the term of the next governor-elect and future President Bill Clinton, who had served as Arkansas Attorney General during Pryor's second two-year term.

U.S. Senate
Pryor finally won McClellan's Senate seat in 1978. McClellan died in 1977, and Governor Pryor appointed a caretaker successor Kaneaster Hodges, Jr., who was prohibited by the Arkansas Constitution from running himself. Pryor won the Democratic senatorial nomination over then U.S. Representatives Jim Guy Tucker and Ray Thornton and then secured a lopsided general election victory in the fall over the liberal Republican Tom Kelly, who advocated marijuana legalization, among other things. He served three Senate terms. His closest contest was his 1984 reelection against the Republican U.S. Representative Edwin Bethune. Despite the presence of Ronald Reagan on the Republican ticket, Pryor still defeated Bethune, 502,3431 (57.3 percent) to 373,615 (42.7 percent). Pryor was unopposed in 1990, and he did not seek a fourth term in 1996. The seat instead went Republican for one term with the election of U.S. Representative Tim Hutchinson. Pryor hence retired from elected office in 1997.

Pryor served as chairman of the Committee on Aging. Pryor was known for his advocacy for the aged and for promoting taxpayer rights. During his tenure, he was secretary of the Democratic Conference, third in the Senate Democratic Leadership.

In 2000 Pryor became Director of the Institute of Politics at Harvard Kennedy School in Cambridge, Massachusetts. He served as dean of the Clinton School of Public Service in Little Rock from 2004 to 2006. In June 2006, President George W. Bush nominated Pryor to the board of the Corporation for Public Broadcasting, and in September of that year he was confirmed by the Senate for a six-year term. As he has done occasionally in the past, Pryor taught a political science course at the University of Arkansas in Fayetteville during the Fall 2008 term.

Post-Senate career
His son is former United States Senator Mark Pryor, a Democrat who held the same seat that his father vacated in 1997.

In 2004, Pryor was one of the five-member board of directors of the Clinton Foundation.

Pryor had quadruple bypass surgery performed by Dr. Tamim Antaki at UAMS on October 11, 2006. He had suffered a heart attack the previous day. His recovery was satisfactory and he was released from the hospital on October 17, 2006. 
 
Pryor briefly returned to politics, when he served as an interim chairman of the Arkansas Democratic Party following the murder of Bill Gwatney, and plays an important role in Arkansas Democratic politics.

Personal life

In 1957, Pryor married Barbara Jean Lunsford, who at the time was a 19 year old freshman at the University of Arkansas. Unable to tolerate the stresses of public life, she briefly lived away from her family from 1975 to 1977, while her husband was governor. During that time, she took various university courses and had trouble finding a job, and she eventually moved back into the governor's mansion after completing her rest.

On July 13, 2020, Arkansas Governor Asa Hutchinson announced at a press briefing about the COVID-19 pandemic in the state that Pryor and his wife Barbara tested positive for the disease with Pryor hospitalized at UAMS in Little Rock and his wife under home quarantine.

References

External links

 Encyclopedia of Arkansas History & Culture entry: David Hampton Pryor
 Oral History Interview with David Pryor from Oral Histories of the American South

|-

|-

|-

|-

|-

|-

|-

|-

1934 births
Arkansas Democratic state chairmen
American Presbyterians
Clinton Foundation people
Democratic Party members of the United States House of Representatives from Arkansas
Democratic Party governors of Arkansas
Democratic Party United States senators from Arkansas
Henderson State University alumni
Harvard Kennedy School staff
Living people
Democratic Party members of the Arkansas House of Representatives
People from Camden, Arkansas
Politicians from Little Rock, Arkansas
University of Arkansas System trustees